Highway One is a 1977 Australian documentary film by Steve Otton, which features Trudie Adams.

Plot
Adventures of a group of surfers who travel the coast surfing and showing "Morning of the Earth".

Impact
In 2018, the film was rediscovered by ABC's investigative team and revealed it features Trudie Adams when she was 18 years old, a year before she went missing in June 1978. In the film, Adams plays the girlfriend of the main character and footage shows her dancing with her on-screen boyfriend and sharing a romantic candlelit dinner. Adams is chatting with friends, and appears fresh-faced and carefree.

Cast
 Kim Bradley - Surfer
 Philip Moneroz - Surfer
 Robert Steen - Surfer

Soundtrack

A soundtrack was released in 1976 and featured music by Richard Clapton, The Dingoes, Ol' 55, Skyhooks and Bigola Bop Band. The single "Capricorn Dancer" peaked at number 40 on the Australian Kent Music Report.

Track listing

Charts

Release history

References

External links

1977 films
Australian documentary films
Soundtracks by Australian artists
1970s English-language films
1970s Australian films